Henry Reinholdt (16 January 1890 – 1 February 1980) was a Norwegian football player. He was born in Skien. He played for the club Odd, and also for the Norwegian national team. He competed at the 1912 Summer Olympics in Stockholm. He was Norwegian champion with Odd in 1913 and 1915.

References

External links

1890 births
1980 deaths
Sportspeople from Skien
Norwegian footballers
Norway international footballers
Odds BK players
Footballers at the 1912 Summer Olympics
Olympic footballers of Norway
Association football forwards